Luc Geismar (born 1 November 1966) is a French politician who has been Member of Parliament for Loire-Atlantique's 5th constituency since 2020.

He was the substitute candidate for Sarah El Haïry in the 2017 French legislative election, and replaced her when she was appointed Secretary of State for Youth at the Ministry of National Education.  He was her substitute again at the 2022 election and replaced her in the 16th Assembly.

References 

Living people
1966 births
People from Colmar

Democratic Movement (France) politicians
Politicians from Centre-Val de Loire
Deputies of the 15th National Assembly of the French Fifth Republic
Deputies of the 16th National Assembly of the French Fifth Republic
21st-century French politicians